Alan Mogridge (born 6 November 1963) is a former speedway rider from England.

Speedway career 
Mogridge reached the final of the British Speedway Championship in 2001. He rode in the top tier of British Speedway from 1981 to 2006, riding for various clubs.

References 

Living people
1963 births
British speedway riders
Berwick Bandits riders
Canterbury Crusaders riders
Crayford Kestrels riders
Eastbourne Eagles riders
Hackney Hawks riders
Ipswich Witches riders
Lakeside Hammers riders
Middlesbrough Bears riders
Peterborough Panthers riders
Rye House Rockets riders
Sheffield Tigers riders
Stoke Potters riders
Swindon Robins riders
Wimbledon Dons riders
Workington Comets riders
Sportspeople from London